The Salt Lake City metropolitan area is the metropolitan area centered on the city of Salt Lake City, Utah. The Office of Management and Budget and the United States Census Bureau currently define the Salt Lake City, Utah Metropolitan Statistical Area as comprising two counties: Salt Lake and Tooele. As of the 2020 census, the MSA had a population of 1,257,936. The Salt Lake City Metropolitan Area and the Ogden-Clearfield Metropolitan Area were a single metropolitan area known as the Salt Lake City-Ogden Metropolitan Area until being separated in 2005.

The metropolitan area is part of the Salt Lake City–Provo–Ogden, UT Combined Statistical Area, which also includes the Ogden–Clearfield metropolitan area, the Provo–Orem metropolitan area, and the Heber City, Utah micropolitan area. As of the 2020 census, this CSA had a population of 2,701,129, comprising 82.6 percent of Utah's then 3,271,616 residents.

Counties
Salt Lake
Tooele

Communities

Incorporated places

Alta
Bluffdale (partial)
Cottonwood Heights
Draper (partial)
Grantsville
Herriman
Holladay
Midvale
Millcreek
Murray
Ophir
Riverton
Rush Valley

Salt Lake City
Sandy
South Jordan
South Salt Lake
Stockton
Taylorsville
Tooele
Vernon
Wendover
West Jordan
West Valley City

Unincorporated places

Copperton (township)
Dugway (census-designated place)
Emigration Canyon (township)
Erda (census-designated place)
Granite (census-designated place)
Kearns (township)

Magna (township)
Pine Canyon
Snowbird
Stansbury Park (census-designated place)
White City (census-designated place)

Demographics

As of the census of 2000, there were 968,858 people, 318,150 households, and 231,606 families residing within the MSA. The racial makeup of the MSA was 86.63% White, 1.04% African American, 0.90% Native American, 2.43% Asian, 1.15% Pacific Islander, 5.33% from other races, and 2.53% from two or more races. Hispanic or Latino of any race were 11.71% of the population.

The median income for a household in the MSA was $53,036, and the median income for a family was $59,139. Males had a median income of $40,683 versus $26,302 for females. The per capita income for the MSA was $23,426.

Combined Statistical Area
The Salt Lake City–Provo–Ogden Combined Statistical Area is made up of ten counties in northern Utah. The statistical area includes three metropolitan areas and one micropolitan area.

Metropolitan Statistical Areas (MSAs)
Salt Lake City MSA (Salt Lake and Tooele counties)
Ogden–Clearfield MSA (Box Elder, Davis, Morgan, and Weber counties)
Provo–Orem MSA (Juab and Utah counties)
Micropolitan Statistical Areas (μSAs)
Heber City (Summit and Wasatch counties)

See also
Utah census statistical areas  
Wasatch Front

References

 
Salt Lake County, Utah
Summit County, Utah
Tooele County, Utah
Metropolitan areas of Utah